Sudha Kongara Prasad Profesionally known as Sudha Kongara is an Indian film director and screenwriter who predominantly works in Tamil cinema. She made her directorial debut with the Telugu film Andhra Andagadu in 2008, and later directed the Tamil film Drohi. In 2016, she directed the bilingual Irudhi Suttru (Saala Khadoos in Hindi) for which she won the Filmfare Award for Best Director – Tamil. She subsequently directed the film's Telugu remake, Guru (2017). In her 15 Year long Career, working over 3 Languages, She Has Won Two National Award, Two Filmfare Award South and Two SIIMA Awards Respectively.

In 2020, she scripted, and directed Soorarai Pottru which was nominated for the Best Foreign Film at the 78th Golden Globe Awards. Soorarai Pottru was featured in the Panorama Section of the Shanghai International Film Festival. At the 68th National Film Awards, it won five awards including Best Feature Film, and Best Screenplay for Sudha Kongara.

Early life
Sudha Kongara was born in Vijayawada, Andhra Pradesh, into a Telugu-speaking family. Sudha grew up in Chennai, Tamil Nadu. She obtained a degree in History and Mass Communication from the Women's Christian College, Chennai.

Career
Kongara worked as a screenwriter for the English film Mitr, My Friend (2002). She worked as associate director for seven years with Mani Ratnam. She made her directorial debut in 2008 with the Telugu film Andhra Andagadu starring Krishna Bhagavaan, however, the film was not successful.

During the production of her first Tamil directorial venture Drohi (2010), Kongara began writing a sports drama film on boxing which was titled Irudhi Suttru. In mid-2013, she approached Madhavan, who was on a sabbatical from Tamil films, to portray the lead role in the film and his presence in the project, helped take the financial viability of the venture to a higher level. The pair had previously collaborated in Madhavan's films under the direction of Mani Ratnam, where Sudha had been an associate director. She then remade Irudhi Suttru in Telugu as Guru. Her next film was Soorarai Pottru which is based on life of Air Deccan founder Captain GR Gopinath feature and it is produced by Suriya's 2D Entertainment and co-produced by Guneet Monga of Sikhya Entertainment.

Filmography

References

Living people
Telugu people
Telugu screenwriters
Telugu film producers
Tamil film directors
Telugu film directors
Indian women film directors
Hindi-language film directors
Indian women screenwriters
Tamil screenwriters
Film directors from Andhra Pradesh
21st-century Indian film directors
21st-century Indian women artists
Filmfare Awards South winners
Women writers from Andhra Pradesh
21st-century Indian screenwriters
1971 births
Directors who won the Best Feature Film National Film Award
21st-century Indian women writers
21st-century Indian writers
Screenwriters from Vijayawada
Date of birth missing (living people)
South Indian International Movie Awards winners